Dorigny may refer to:

Surname 
 Michel Dorigny (1617-1663), French painter and engraver, father of Nicolas and Louis (Ludovico) Dorigny
 Ludovico Dorigny (1654-1742), French painter and engraver
 Nicolas Dorigny (1658-1746), French engraver

Places 
 Dorigny, name of the place where the main campuses of the University of Lausanne (UNIL) and the Swiss Federal Institute of Technology in Lausanne (EPFL) are located. See Lausanne campus.
 Quartier Dorigny, one of the five areas of the main campus of the University of Lausanne served by the Lausanne Metro line 1 from UNIL-Dorigny station
 Grange de Dorigny, the theatre of the University of Lausanne
 Ferme de Dorigny ("Farm of Dorigny"), a building of the University of Lausanne, home of the Jean Monnet Foundation for Europe
 Château de Dorigny ("Castle of Dorigny"), a building of the University of Lausanne
 Mont-d'Origny in northern France

Notes and references